is a railway station on the Hohi Main Line operated by JR Kyushu in Taketa, Ōita Prefecture, Japan.

Lines

Layout 
The station consists of a side platform serving a single track at grade. The station building is wooden structure of traditional Japanese design built to resemble a Shinto shrine. It is unstaffed and serves only to house a waiting area.

Adjacent stations

History
The track was extended westwards in phases, with this station opening as the new western terminus on 30 November 1925. Through-traffic was established between Kumamoto and Ōita. The two lines were merged and the entire stretch redesignated as the Hōhi Main Line. With the privatization of Japanese National Railways (JNR), the successor of JGR, on 1 April 1987, the station came under the control of JR Kyushu.

On 17 September 2017, Typhoon Talim (Typhoon 18) damaged the Hōhi Main Line at several locations. Services between Aso and Nakahanda, including Tamarai, were suspended and replaced by bus services. Rail service from Aso through this station to Miemachi was restored by 22 September 2017 Normal rail services between Aso and Ōita were restored by 2 October 2017.

Passenger statistics
In fiscal 2015, there were a total of 4,899 boarding passengers, giving a daily average of 13 passengers.

See also
List of railway stations in Japan

References

External links
Tamarai (JR Kyushu)

Railway stations in Ōita Prefecture
Railway stations in Japan opened in 1925